Emma Moffatt (born 7 September 1984) is a retired Australian professional triathlete. She won a bronze medal at the 2008 Summer Olympics in Beijing, and won the gold at the ITU Triathlon World Championships in 2009 and in 2010. She was born in Moree, New South Wales, and was raised in the northern New South Wales town of Woolgoolga.

From a young age, she participated in such sports as cross country, athletics, and surf lifesaving. In her early teens, Emma began successfully participating in triathlon. Each of her three siblings and parents also competed in triathlon, while her elder sister Nicole was a champion Ironwoman in surf lifesaving.

Before she went to the Australian Institute of Sport, she went to Woolgoolga High School. She is an Australian Institute of Sport scholarship holder.  She has been named Triathlon Australia's athlete of the year twice, in 2007 and 2012.  In 2009, she was the Australian Institute of Sport's athlete of the year.

Moffatt was selected by the Australian Olympic Committee to compete in the London 2012 Olympics. The event was held in and around Hyde Park, with the swim being held in the Serpentine. However, she did not finish the event after a heavy fall during the cycling stage.

She came second in the  run of the Gold Coast Marathon-event on 1 July 2012 in Gold Coast, Queensland, Australia, finishing behind Lisa Jane Weightman.

At the 2014 Commonwealth Games, she was part of the Australian mixed relay team that won bronze.

References

External links 
 Emma Moffatt Official Website
 Australian Olympic Committee profile

1984 births
Living people
Australian female triathletes
Triathletes at the 2008 Summer Olympics
Triathletes at the 2012 Summer Olympics
Triathletes at the 2016 Summer Olympics
Olympic triathletes of Australia
Olympic bronze medalists for Australia
Sportswomen from Queensland
Olympic medalists in triathlon
Sportswomen from New South Wales
Medalists at the 2008 Summer Olympics
Triathletes at the 2014 Commonwealth Games
Commonwealth Games bronze medallists for Australia
Sportspeople from Brisbane
Commonwealth Games medallists in triathlon
21st-century Australian women
Medallists at the 2014 Commonwealth Games